Parker v. North Carolina, 397 U.S. 790 (1970), was a United States Supreme Court case in which the Court ruled that a plea agreement was valid even if the defendant entered into it in order to avoid the death penalty and even if his decision was based on a possibly mistaken belief on the part of the defendant and his lawyer that a confession the defendant had made would be admissible in court.

References

External links
 

United States Supreme Court cases
United States Supreme Court cases of the Burger Court
1970 in United States case law